XHVAY-FM 92.7/XEVAY-AM 740 is a combo radio station in Puerto Vallarta, Jalisco. It is owned by Grupo ACIR and carries its 'Mix' English-language contemporary music format.

History
XEVAY received its first concession on December 29, 1986. It was owned by Nenette Semenow Canan.

In 1994, XEVAY became an AM-FM combo.

References

Spanish-language radio stations
Radio stations in Jalisco
Radio stations established in 1986
Grupo ACIR